William John Berezowsky (January 6, 1904 – January 17, 1974) was an Austro-Hungarian Empire-born businessman, farmer, civil servant and political figure in Saskatchewan. He represented Cumberland from 1952 to 1967 and Prince Albert East-Cumberland from 1967 to 1971 in the Legislative Assembly of Saskatchewan as a Co-operative Commonwealth Federation (CCF) and then New Democratic Party (NDP) member.

He came to western Canada with his family in 1908 and was educated in Winnipeg, Prince Albert, Saskatchewan and Saskatoon. Berezowsky worked for the railway, taught school, worked on the family farm and then worked as a prospector. He served in the Royal Canadian Air Force during World War II. Berezowsky was staff training superintendent for the Saskatchewan Department of Natural Resources from 1948 to 1952. He also served as secretary-treasurer for the rural municipality of Garden River No. 490, Saskatchewan from 1927 to 1943 and as president and secretary for the Meath Park Board of Trade. In 1972, he was defeated by John Diefenbaker when he ran as an NDP candidate in the federal Prince Albert riding.

The W.J. Berezowsky School was named in his honour.

References

External links 
 

Saskatchewan Co-operative Commonwealth Federation MLAs
20th-century Canadian legislators
Saskatchewan New Democratic Party MLAs
Ukrainian Austro-Hungarians
Austro-Hungarian emigrants to Canada
People from the Kingdom of Galicia and Lodomeria
Royal Canadian Air Force personnel of World War II
1904 births
1974 deaths